Asbjørn Osnes (21 April 1932 – 22 September 2011) was a Norwegian ski jumper.

He placed 18th in the individual ski jump event at the 1956 Winter Olympics in Cortina d'Ampezzo. In 1958 he improved the hill record at Vikersundbakken.

He was born in Hønefoss, represented the club Jevnaker IF and died in Jevnaker.

References

External links

1932 births
2011 deaths
People from Jevnaker
Ski jumpers at the 1956 Winter Olympics
Norwegian male ski jumpers
Olympic ski jumpers of Norway
People from Ringerike (municipality)
Sportspeople from Viken (county)
20th-century Norwegian people